The Pequot are a Native American people of Connecticut.

Pequot may also refer to:

Pequot language, historically spoken by the people
Pequot Capital Management, a hedge fund
USS Pequot, a list of ships
Pequot Motors, a Nicaraguan motorcycle manufacturer

See also
Pequod (disambiguation)